Dmytro Bezotosnyi (born 15 November 1983) is a Ukrainian footballer who plays as a goalkeeper.

Career
On 15 January 2015, Bezotosnyi signed a six-month contract with Azerbaijan Premier League side Gabala FK, following fellow former FC Chornomorets Odesa teammate Oleksiy Gai to the club. On 21 May 2016, Bezotosnyi signed a new contract with Gabala until the end of the 2016/17 season.

On 21 October 2019, Bezotosnyi left Chornomorets Odesa by mutual consent.

Career statistics

Club

Honours
Gabala
Azerbaijan Cup: 2018–19

References

External links 

Player's profile on club's official website (Russian)

1983 births
Living people
Ukrainian footballers
FC Metalurh Zaporizhzhia players
FC Chornomorets Odesa players
Ukrainian Premier League players
Ukrainian First League players
Ukrainian Second League players
Gabala FC players
Azerbaijan Premier League players
Ukrainian expatriate footballers
Expatriate footballers in Azerbaijan
Expatriate footballers in Russia
Association football goalkeepers
Sportspeople from Khmelnytskyi, Ukraine
Ukrainian expatriate sportspeople in Azerbaijan
Ukrainian expatriate sportspeople in Russia
FC Saturn Ramenskoye players